This is a list of regions of Barbados by Human Development Index as of 2021.

References 

Barbados
Human Development Index
Barbados